Branksome is a suburb of Poole in Dorset, England. The area consists of residential properties and also a number of commercial and industrial areas.

It borders Parkstone, another small Poole suburb, to the west and north west, Alder Hills to the north east, Branksome Park (a more affluent forested area) to the south and Westbourne (a suburb of Bournemouth, Poole's conurbation neighbour) to the east.

Overview
Until the late 19th century the area was mainly unbuilt heath and woodlands. With the development and growth of nearby Bournemouth and later Poole the area became popular as a place to live, mainly because the area was relatively undeveloped but yet was within commuting distance between Poole and Bournemouth.

With the development of the railways, Branksome continued to grow, served by the new Victorian line between Wimborne, Poole and Bournemouth. Branksome railway station which still serves the area today helped encourage a massive growth in the early 20th century. Most of the houses in Branksome today are from the Edwardian period and before the Second World War except for a 1970s development off of Winston Avenue known as the Farnham Estate and also a small amount of in-filling.

The area became an official suburb of Poole in the 1960s and by the 1980s almost all open areas of Branksome were built upon. The area however still has some heathland towards the Wallisdown and Canford Heath areas, as well as a large and popular park known as the Branksome Recreation Ground, which is home to Parkstone Cricket Club. Branksome merges with the area known as Branksome Park, an area of more expensive properties.

Commercial development
There are three main areas of commercial development within the Branksome Parish.

The main area, Poole Retail Park (sometimes known as Redlands after the pipe factory once on the site) is situated along the main Poole to Bournemouth A35. It is a commercial and shopping area that includes several large chain stores. These include:

John Lewis & Partners at Home
Homebase
Homesense
FTY Lab
Home Bargains
Next Home
Oak Furnitureland
Boots
Pets at Home
Sports Direct
Everlast (brand) Gyms

The John Lewis store named John Lewis at Home opened in Branksome on 22 October 2009. The £6 million development is one-third of the size of a normal John Lewis department store and is the first of a new experimental format for the retailer focusing exclusively on homeware.

Accessed from Alder Road but essentially part of the Poole Retail Park area is a series of industrial buildings that were associated with the former confectionary factory that ceased operating in 2013.  BCP Council approved plans for the site to be turned into a 70-bed residential care home with 32 extra care apartments in 2016.  Aldi purchased the site in 2018, and made an unsuccessful bid to seek planning approval to turn it into a supermarket in August 2020.  Despite this, the Daily Echo reports in February 2022 that the supermarket chain is now hopeful that a decision on its revised plans for a new store on the disused sweet factory site will be made "in the near future".

The second area is situated on the old Gas Works site near to Yarmouth Road and Bourne Valley Road, known as Branksome Business Park it contains a number of industrial units.

The third area is situated to the northern end of the parish and is known as the Sharp Road Industrial Estate. Just outside the parish and to the west lies another substantial industrial area which includes a post office sorting office and other commercial developments. 

Branksome has three main supermarkets, Tesco, Sainsbury's and Lidl. Both the Tesco and Sainsbury's stores have petrol filling stations attached. Along the A35 (Poole Road) there are a number of small independent retailers including fast food outlets, a bowling complex and a car showroom.

The major insurer Liverpool Victoria is situated towards the east of the boundary in a large building contained within the County Gates Roundabout.

Along Alder Road are a number of small independent shops. This area is known locally as "Alder Parade".

Transport 
Branksome is served by hourly South Western Railway trains, calling at Branksome railway station on the South West Main Line between Weymouth and London Waterloo. However the closure of the Somerset and Dorset Joint Railway cut the direct line linking to Bath. 

Branksome has bus links to many areas of Bournemouth and Poole. As of November 2022 Branksome is served by morebus services m1, m2, 15, 16, 17, 20 and U2.

National Express coaches call at Branksome, Poole Road with services to London Victoria, Heathrow Airport and Gatwick Airport.

Education

Branksome is home to Bishop Aldhelm's CE Primary School.

Politics 

Branksome lies partly within the UK Parliamentary constituency of Poole and partly within Bournemouth West. The Member of Parliament for Poole is Sir Robert Syms and Conor Burns for Bournemouth West.

The unitary authority ward is Alderney and Bourne Valley, and is represented by Councillors Toby Johnson, Rachel Maidment and Tony Trent, in Bournemouth, Poole and Christchurch Council.

Until the early part of the 20th century Branksome had its own council, the Branksome Urban District Council. This council's former headquarters were made into an Elderly Persons' dwelling in 1987 and called Bob Hann House after Robert George Hann, Mayor of Poole 1968/69, who was Chairman of the Poole Borough Housing Committee from 1973 until his death in 1986.

Places of worship
The parish church of Branksome is St Aldhelm's Church which falls within the Diocese of Salisbury.  

Other places of worship include:

Gateway Church
Parkstone Baptist Church
Dorset Islamic Cultural Association

Medical
Heatherview Medical Centre is located near to the Sainsbury supermarket off Alder Road in Alder Hills.  The local clinical commissioning group is NHS Dorset CCG.

Industrial heritage
Sharp, Jones and Co - Pipe Manufacturers
Bournemouth Gas Works 
Railway Viaducts 
Electricity Sub Station
Old clay work ponds

Notable residents
Lord Ventry – Airship Pioneer. Owned a large house and land in between Poole Road and Lindsey Road.

References

External links

 Branksome Library
 Branksome Recreation Ground
 Branksome Parish Boundary
 Bishop Aldhelm Primary School

Areas of Poole